Baron Stanley is an abeyant title in the Peerage of England. It was created in 1456 for Sir Thomas Stanley. His son was created Earl of Derby in 1485 and the titles remained united until the death of the fifth earl, without male heirs in 1594, when the barony became abeyant. On 7 March 1921, the abeyance was terminated in favour of the 12th Countess of Loudoun, but upon her death in 1960, it became abeyant among her daughters.

Barons Stanley (1456) 
 Thomas Stanley, 1st Baron Stanley (d. 1459)
 Thomas Stanley, 1st Earl of Derby, 2nd Baron Stanley (d. 1504)
 Thomas Stanley, 2nd Earl of Derby, 3rd Baron Stanley (d. 1521)
 Edward Stanley, 3rd Earl of Derby, 4th Baron Stanley (1509–1572)
 Henry Stanley, 4th Earl of Derby, 5th Baron Stanley (1531–1593)
 Ferdinando Stanley, 5th Earl of Derby, 6th Baron Stanley (1559–1594), abeyant 1594.
 Edith Maud Abney-Hastings, 12th Countess of Loudoun, 7th Baroness Stanley (1883–1960), abeyance terminated 1921, abeyant 1960.

See also
 Audley-Stanley family

References

1456 establishments in England
Noble titles created in 1456
 
Baron
Abeyant baronies in the Peerage of England